Susan Patricia Loughnane (born 16 February 1987) is an Irish actress and author. She is known for playing Debbie in drama Love/Hate, for which she won the 2013 Irish Film and Television Award for Best Supporting Actress. Her first novel The Art of Scandal was published in October 2014.

Career
Loughnane trained at the Lee Strasberg Theatre and Film Institute in New York City. Loughnane's first role was on the Irish hidden-camera comedy TV series Anonymous as the daughter of Pamela Flood's character Doreen. She then appeared as Elaine in Single-Handed.

Loughnane was also a contestant on the sixth series of Britain's Next Top Model in 2010. She auditioned for the show as "a challenge" to herself and because she was struggling to find work in Ireland due to the recession. She was the last contestant selected for the final fourteen, which she described as "painful". She was eliminated early in the series, but continued to model, and was employed by Morgan the Agency.

Loughnane appeared as Debbie in seasons 2, 3, and 4 of Love/Hate between 2011 and 2013. During this time, she retained her job as a cashier in an Abercrombie & Fitch store, stating she kept the job in case acting "doesn't work out". Initially introduced as the girlfriend of Aiden Gillen's character John Boy, Debbie spiraled into heroin abuse and prostitution before ultimately dying of an overdose in the fourth season. Loughnane won the 2013 Irish Film and Television Award for Best Supporting Actress for the role.

She also played the guest role of Chloe in Hollyoaks in August 2013, and returned for a longer stint in November of that year. She went on to appear in Loving Miss Hatto and The Food Guide to Love in 2010 and 2013 respectively. In 2014, she appeared in Poison Pen alongside Lochlann O'Mearain, before completing a course in standup comedy at the Upright Citizens Brigade in New York. The following year, Loughnane joined the Hardy Bucks television show as Patty.

Loughnane's first novel, The Art of Scandal, was published in October 2014.

Personal life
Loughnane got engaged to her long-term boyfriend in February 2015, and they married in August 2016. The couple had been dating since they met in secondary school. Loughnane announced her pregnancy on her second wedding anniversary in August 2018.

Filmography

Film

Television

References

External links
 

Irish television actresses
Irish film actresses
Irish soap opera actresses
Lee Strasberg Theatre and Film Institute alumni
Living people
1987 births
Actresses from Dublin (city)
21st-century Irish actresses
Britain & Ireland's Next Top Model contestants